The Duncan Cedar, also known as the Duncan Memorial Cedar and the Nolan Creek Tree, is a large specimen of Western redcedar. The tree is located on the Olympic Peninsula in the U.S. state of Washington. It is currently the second largest known Western redcedar in the world, after the Cheewhat Giant on Canada's Vancouver Island. 

After the death in 2016 of the Quinault Big Cedar, the Duncan Cedar became the largest known Western redcedar in the United States by volume. It is also the largest tree of any species in Washington state, and among the largest trees on earth outside of California's remaining old-growth Redwood forests. 

The Duncan Cedar is located in Jefferson County, approximately 15 miles from U.S. Route 101 on land managed by the Washington State Department of Natural Resources and is accessible only by unmaintained logging roads. The tree is surrounded by second growth forest that has grown up after the original old-growth rainforest in this area was clearcut by commercial logging interests in the mid-20th century. It is not known why this individual tree was spared by the loggers. The tree is named after the loggers who discovered it. 

The Duncan Cedar is estimated to be over 1,000 years old. Most of the tree is dead, with the exception of a strip of bark on one of the trunks. In addition, the tree's root system was damaged when an interpretive trail was built around its trunk. However, due to redcedar's natural resilience to pests and rot, the Duncan Cedar is not necessarily in poor health. According to University of Washington Forestry Professor Robert Van Pelt, the tree may live for many more centuries, unless destroyed by wind, fire, or human intervention.

See also
 List of individual trees

References

Individual trees in Washington (state)
Individual western redcedar trees
Jefferson County, Washington